In tonal languages, tone names are the names given to the tones these languages use.

In contemporary standard Chinese (Mandarin), the tones are numbered from 1 to 4. They are descended from but not identical to the historical  four tones of Middle Chinese, namely level, rising, departing, and entering, each split into yin and yang registers, and the categories of high and low syllables.

 Standard Vietnamese has six tones, known as ngang, sắc, huyền, hỏi, ngã, and nặng tones.
 Thai has five phonemic tones: mid, low, falling, high and rising, sometimes referred to in older reference works as rectus, gravis, circumflexus, altus and demissus, respectively. The table shows an example of both the phonemic tones and their phonetic realization, in the IPA.

See also
Tone letter
Tone number
Archaic & modern four tones in Chinese

References 

Tone (linguistics)
Linguistics terminology
Chinese language
Vietnamese language